Retrospekt is a 2018 Dutch drama film directed by Esther Rots. It was screened in the Contemporary World Cinema section at the 2018 Toronto International Film Festival.

Cast
 Teun Luijkx as Klaas
 Circé Lethem as Mette
 Nele Hardiman as Nurse
 Matthijs Ten Kate as HRM lawyer

References

External links
 

2018 films
2018 drama films
Dutch drama films
2010s Dutch-language films
Films directed by Esther Rots